Palaiometocho, officially Palaiometocho, is a village in the Nicosia District of Cyprus. Its name derives from the Greek palaio (old) and metochio (inn). It was probably given to it because it used to be a rest stop for pilgrims on their way to the Kykkos Monastery. As of 2011, Palaiometocho had a population of 4,145.

References

Communities in Nicosia District